Multi-boxing or multiboxing refers to playing as multiple separate characters concurrently in an MMORPG. This can either be achieved by using multiple separate machines to run the game or by running multiple separate instances of the game. Multiboxing is considered to be difficult to do well without practice, as it involves adapting to problems in real-time.

Variations on the term are common. Often, the number of accounts used is reflected in the term used: dual-boxing or two-boxing for two characters, three-boxing for three etc. On MUDs (the predecessors of MMORPGs) multiboxing is easy to accomplish on a single machine using a MUD client, and the practice is generally called multiplaying. In 2018 The Mud Connector listed 955 MUDs of which 605 allow multiplaying.

Reasons for use 

Multiboxing is done for several reasons. People may enjoy the additional challenge it can bring, as well as being able to tackle more difficult monsters by themselves.
Sometimes it is a matter of convenience, having permanent access to a character that can buff, heal or resurrect the main character.

Overall, Multiboxing can be considered a play style choice. Many people find the additional strategy of multiboxing to be very challenging and, with those additional efforts, very rewarding.  Rather than require the collaboration and cooperation of multiple human players, people who multibox instead rely upon themselves to control multiple game characters and utilize their own abilities as a replacement for human cooperation.

While multiboxing, the player does not necessarily have to spend time looking for a group to join in an adventure with, but rather can repeatedly participate in content without the risk of someone leaving in the middle of the encounter.

Tools 

Multiboxing may be as simple as running two instances of the game on one computer (each logged into a separate account) and switching between them. Players may also use multiple computers, each with their own keyboard and mouse. This quickly becomes impractical with an increasing number of computers, so a keyboard demultiplexer may be used, which sends the signals from a single keyboard to several computers or virtual machines on one computer.

Software tools include programs which can simulate keyboard multiplexing by sending keystrokes to different instances of the game simultaneously, or across networks. Voice command software can also be used. One of the earliest programs for multiboxing was the TinTin++ MUD client, which allowed playing and botting multiple characters, much to the chagrin of others, including the Merc (MUD) developers who discussed a programmatic way to detect multi-playing on Usenet in 1993.

Often, heavy use is made of the macros built into the game's default interface. This allows more complex instructions to be issued with a single keypress. Examples include targeting a certain character and healing them, or firing a spell at another character's target.

Compatibility with the game's rules 

Multiboxing is generally allowed by MMORPG End User License Agreements, because the characters are still subject to all the normal rules of the game world and are controlled by the player directly. This is in contrast to bots that partially or fully control the characters, which are against the terms of service of most online games.

Most MMORPGs only allow a single character per account to be logged in at once, so multi-boxers need a separate account for each character they want to play simultaneously. In subscription based services, this means paying multiple monthly fees, and buying several copies of game expansions. However, with trial accounts, multiboxing for free is possible. Using World of Warcraft: Starter Edition is one example which has unlimited play for free, albeit with certain in-game limitations surrounding maximum level, currency accrual, etc.

Most game developers allow multiboxing in their games.  To date, Age of Conan, Aion, Anarchy Online, City of Heroes, City of Villains, Dungeons and Dragons Online, EVE Online, Lord of the Rings Online, Heroes of Newerth, EverQuest, EverQuest II, Lineage, Lineage II, Vanguard: Saga of Heroes, Rakion Latin-Internacional and Warhammer Online all allow multiboxing. The Chronicles of Spellborn and Rift allow hardware multiboxing, but prohibit software multiboxing. Game publishers do not provide technical support for multiboxing, so while it may be allowed, these games may not be designed to be multiboxed.

Not all MMORPGs condone multiboxing. When MMORPG rules address the subject, the most common regulation provides that a player can only have one account from an IP address logged on at once; in the text-based early years of online role-playing gaming, some multi-user dungeons (MUDs) would set slightly looser limits, such as permitting a maximum of two simultaneously active accounts per human user (e.g., a fighter/"tank" and a healer) subject to the requirement that both be actively controlled by the human as opposed to by a script. Games that do not allow a player to have more than one character at a time include Immortal Night. Such rules are usually implemented to keep players from trading to themselves items that load with limited frequency or that will not load if a currently active player has the item equipped or in inventory, as by acquiring the item, giving it to one's secondary character, and then having the secondary character exit the game until the item reloads.

References

Esports terminology
Massively multiplayer online role-playing games
Video game terminology